The Ephorate of Underwater Antiquities is a department within the Greek Ministry of Culture responsible for underwater archaeology. 

The Ephorate was founded in 1976, and has jurisdiction over the entirety of Greece (unlike the regional antiquities ephorates). Permission from the EUA is needed to conduct surveys and photography dives on architectural structures, such as shipwrecks, in Greek waters. The EUA itself is also responsible for the discovery, exploration, and maintenance of underwater activities. 

The Ephorate operates two regional offices, based in Thessaloniki and Heraklion.

In 2003, the Ephorate was given jurisdiction over all wrecks of ships and aircraft more than fifty years old.

A Museum of Underwater Antiquities is currently being designed, under the auspices of the EUA. It will be situated in the harbour of Piraeus, and is projected to be completed in 2025.

References

Archaeology of Greece
1976 establishments in Greece
Underwater archaeology